Yim Sovann  (born 28 September 1964) is a Cambodian politician, who was the Spokesperson and President of the Executive Committee of the Cambodia National Rescue Party. He was an elected member of the Cambodian parliament representing Phnom Penh until 2017, when the Cambodia National Rescue Party was dissolved. He is also a successful businessman, and a father of two children. He also served as Deputy Leader of the Opposition.

Yim Sovann was first elected to represent Phnom Penh in the National Assembly of Cambodia in 1998. Age just 34 at the time, he was Cambodia's youngest parliamentarian. He ventured into Cambodian politics as the Secretary to the Minister of Finance in 1993 and later became a founding member of the Khmer Nation Party (later changed its name to Sam Rainsy Party). He was the Treasurer and Spokesperson of the Sam Rainsy Party. When the Cambodian National Rescue Party was formed, he was appointed President of the Executive Committee of the party as well as being the Party's Spokesperson. He was also the Chairman of the Parliamentary Commission on Interior, National Defense, and Civil Service Administration from 2005 to 2008 in the National Assembly of Cambodia. In January 2015, he became Secretary General of the Parliamentary Minority Group. In December 2016 following Sam Rainsy's exile, he became Deputy Leader of the Opposition until the position was abolished by Parliament on 31 January 2017.

Yim Sovann is known for his calm but effective and motivational public speeches and is highly respected for his tireless effort in fighting against corruption and pursuing human rights in Cambodia. Due to his undoubted abilities, his nomination for the Chairman of the Parliamentary Commission on Investigation and Anti-Corruption, considered perhaps the most key parliamentary commission, was rejected by the ruling Cambodian People's Party on 27 August 2014. He has been an influential opposition party lawmaker having been elected since 1998.

Early life 
Born in 1964, Sovann grew up in Phnom Penh and was forced to endure a miserable period like many other Cambodians under the Pol Pot regime.

Education 
Yim Sovann graduated with a Bachelor of Economics from the National University of Management, Phnom Penh, Cambodia. In 1993, he was awarded a full-ride scholarship to Japan where he received a Master's degree in Political Science from Saitama University, Japan. He has also received a degree from Tsinghua University, studying English and Japanese.

Politics 

Yim Sovann entered politics as the assistant to the minister of finance during 1993–94, while continuing his studies in Japan. He has been a member of parliament (MP) for Phnom Penh since 1998. He was also Chairman of Parliamentary Commission on Interior, National Defense, and Civil Service Administration from 2005 to 2008 in the National Assembly. In January 2015, he became Secretary General of the Parliamentary Minority Group. In January 2015, he became Secretary General of the Parliamentary Minority Group. In December 2016 following Sam Rainsy's exile, he became Deputy Leader of the Opposition until the position was abolished by Parliament on 31 January 2017.

References

External links
 
 BBC: "Cambodia opposition boycott opening of parliament"

1964 births
Living people
Members of the National Assembly (Cambodia)
Candlelight Party politicians
Cambodia National Rescue Party politicians
People from Phnom Penh